Cotillion is an 18–19th century French dance.

Cotillion may also refer to:

 Cotillions (album), a Billy Corgan album
 Cotillion (Malazan), a character in the Malazan Book of the Fallen series
 Cotillion (novel), a 1953 Regency novel by Georgette Heyer
 Cotillion ball, a formal presentation of young ladies, debutantes, to polite society
 Cotillion Ballroom, a music venue in Wichita, Kansas
 Cotillion Hall, a historic dance hall in Portland, Oregon, United States
 Cotillion Handicap, an annual American Thoroughbred horse race in Bensalem, Pennsylvania
 Cotillion Records, a record label
 HMS Cotillion, a name of several Royal Navy ships